Ferdinand V is the name of:
Ferdinand II of Aragon, Ferdinand V of Castile, the Catholic king of Castile, Aragon and Naples
Ferdinand I of Austria, Ferdinand V of Hungary and Bohemia.